Donte' Hill (born October 4, 1978) is an American basketball  head coach who last coached for the Iwate Big Bulls of the Japanese B.League.

Head coaching record

|- 
| style="text-align:left;"|Tsukuba Robots
| style="text-align:left;"|2013–14
| 54||10||44|||| style="text-align:center;"|4th in NBL Western|||-||-||-||
| style="text-align:center;"|-
|-
| style="text-align:left;"|Tsukuba Robots
| style="text-align:left;"|2014
| 16||0||16|||| style="text-align:center;"|Fired|||-||-||-||
| style="text-align:center;"|-
|-
|- style="background:#FDE910;"
| style="text-align:left;"|Danang Dragons
| style="text-align:left;"|2016
| 16||4||12|||| style="text-align:center;"|5th|||5||5||0||
| style="text-align:center;"|League Champions
|-
| style="text-align:left;"|Danang Dragons
| style="text-align:left;"|2017
| 15||2||13|||| style="text-align:center;"|6th|||-||-||-||
| style="text-align:center;"|Did not qualify
|-
| style="text-align:left;"|Iwate Big Bulls
| style="background-color:#FFCCCC" "text-align:left;"|2018
| 32||5||27|||| style="text-align:center;"|6th in B2 Eastern|||-||-||-||
| style="text-align:center;"|Relegated to B3
|-

References

1974 births
Living people
American expatriate basketball people in Japan
American men's basketball coaches
Cyberdyne Ibaraki Robots coaches
Ferris State Bulldogs men's basketball players
Iwate Big Bulls coaches
American men's basketball players